Lamboklang Mylliem is an Indian politician from Meghalaya. He represented the Jirang constituency as a member of the North East Social Democratic Party.

References

Living people
Meghalaya politicians
Meghalaya MLAs 2013–2018
Year of birth missing (living people)